Plasmodium gracilis is a parasite of the genus Plasmodium.

Like all Plasmodium species P. gracilis has both vertebrate and insect hosts. The vertebrate hosts for this parasite are reptiles.

Description 
The parasite was first described by Telford and Wellehan in 2005.

Geographical occurrence 
This species is found in New Guinea.

Clinical features and host pathology 
This species infects the crocodile skink Tribolonotus gracilis.

References 

gracilis